Fellowship of the Dice is a film released in 2005 (2007 on DVD), directed by Matthew Ross, and starring Aimee Graham and Price Carson.  It combines interviews and scenes from Strategicon 2004 a real-life role playing game convention with a fictional account (mockumentary) of a game with the players portrayed by actors.  As the fictional game progresses, it is intercut with interviews and scenes from the convention.

Plot
The movie tracks three plot lines: interviews at a role playing game convention (RPGCon), Elizabeth's (Aimee Graham, the lead character) interaction with the justice system, and the game in which Elizabeth is a first-time player.

Elizabeth violates her house arrest sentence to attend her first game at the invitation of a stranger she meets in a gaming store.  Elizabeth risks jail because of the terms of her sentence.  In a key plot twist, she chooses to finish the game session: Because her ankle monitor  has been inadvertently activated, she is in danger of re-arrest if she does not immediately return home.

By the end of the movie it is made plain that in gaming with her new companions, Elizabeth has found her path to redemption, her path away from a life of petty crime and drugs.  When her parole officer (Price Carson) asks her, “was it worth it?”, she answers, “yes.”

Cast
This is a listing of the main characters.  The interviewees at the RPGCon are omitted, as are some minor characters.

Aimee Graham as Elizabeth, the protagonist.  
Price Carson as Officer Banus, Elizabeth's parole officer.
Jeff Coatney as Jasper, the Game Master.
Jon Collins as Larry, a gamer.
Jon Dabach as Kevin, a gamer.
Lucia Diaz Sas as Gwen, a gamer.
John Michael Scholl as Jack, a gamer.
Alastair Surprise as Sanford, a gamer.
Directed by Matthew Ross. 	
Written by Tom Hietter.

Distributors
Breakthrough Distribution (2005) (USA) (DVD) 
Reel Indie Film (2007) (USA) (DVD), ASIN B000OQDSHC.

External links
 Official Website
Fellowship of the Dice at Internet Movie Database  
 Fellowship of the Dice at Rotten Tomatoes

Related Films 
The Gamers (film) has a similar theme.

2005 films
2005 comedy films
Imprisonment and detention
American independent films
American mockumentary films
American comedy films
2000s English-language films
2000s American films